Tekwan is a Palembang soup dish originated from the Indonesian region of Palembang. The dish contain some small size fish cakes made of local Musi river's fish similar to pempek preparation, and it served with the savoury shrimp (or prawn) broth, rice vermicelli, mushrooms, sliced jicama, and sprinkled with sliced fresh celery, scallion and fried shallot.

Etymology
Tekwan name originated from Hokkien tâi-oân (台丸), homophonically similar to Taiwan.

See also

 List of fish dishes
 List of Indonesian soups
 List of soups

References

Fish dishes
Indonesian soups
Palembang cuisine